Tope Oshin is a Nigerian television and film director, producer and casting director, listed as one of the most influential Nigerians in film in 2019. 
In 2015 Pulse magazine named her as one of "9 Nigerian female movie directors you should know" in the Nollywood film industry. and in March 2018, in commemoration of the Women's History Month, Tope was celebrated by OkayAfrica as one of the Okay100 Women. The interactive campaign celebrates extraordinary women from Africa and the diaspora making waves across a wide array of industries, while driving positive impact in their communities and the world at large.

Early life and education
Tope hails from a devout Christian family. As a child, she engaged in drawing, singing, and dancing, and had aspirations to be a painter. She studied Economics at the University of Ilorin, Kwara State, and then Theatre Arts, TV & Film Production at Lagos State University. She became more interested in filmmaking and later studied Film Production, and Cinematography at Colorado Film School of the Community College of Aurora, Denver, and Met Film School, Ealing Studios, London respectively.
Tope is also an alumnus of 'Talents Durban'  and Berlinale Talents, a networking summit of select outstanding creatives from the world of film and drama series across the globe.

Career
Tope, who was an actor for 12 years, featuring in films like Relentless (2010 film), before veering into directing, working as an associate producer and assistant director for The Apprentice Africa. and has since become known for directing popular African TV dramas and soap operas such as Hush, Hotel Majestic, Tinsel (TV series) and MTV Shuga.
Though she has directed and produced several introspective short film projects such as The Young Smoker, Till Death Do Us Part, New Horizons and Ireti, she is known best for her highly successful 2018 feature film releases Up North (film), and New Money.

Oshin has produced some of the highest box office breaking movies in Nigeria, including the 2015 romantic film Fifty, about four fifty-year-old female Lagos residents, which broke box office records upon release in December 2015, taking N20 million in the first weekend. and The Wedding Party 2, as at 2018, the highest grossing Nigerian film.

In 2016, she produced and directed the documentary, Amaka's Kin: The Women Of Nollywood, as a memorial to prominent filmmaker Amaka Igwe, who died in 2014. The documentary addresses issues facing Nigerian female directors, working in a male-dominated industry.

As a follow-up to her documentary, in 2017, and as part of the BBC 100 Women season, Tope celebrated the new generation of women filmmakers reinventing Nollywood, by presenting the BBC documentary Nigeria-Shooting It Like A Woman.
Apart from the BBC World Service documentary, Tope's Amaka's Kin - The Women Of Nollywood also influenced a lot of other TV shows and literary works alike, including Niran Adedokun's book Ladies Calling the Shots.

Oshin racked up some controversy in Nigeria, when she co-wrote, directed and produced the Queer film We Don't Live Here Anymore (2018 film) for human rights organization TIERs (The Initiative For Equal Rights) in 2018. The movie was not accepted for a cinema release and received only a limited online release with FilmOne Distribution in 2018. We Don't Live Here Anymore however screened at Africa In Motion Film Festival in Glasgow, and also racked up a lot of nominations and awards surprisingly at 2018 Best Of Nollywood Awards in Nigeria. The film can be found currently on Amazon.

Tope also has a thriving career as a Casting director and has cast for several film and television projects including all 3 Nigerian seasons of the MTV Staying Alive Foundation drama series Shuga

Tope, through her company Sunbow Productions [ng], was commissioned to produce Season 8 of MTV Shuga (TV Series), dubbed MTV Shuga Naija 4, and is credited as Head Director, Showrunner, Executive Producer and Producer, after directing and casting Season 6 of the show in 2017.

In 2015 Tope served as a juror for the International Emmy Award for the first time.

Personal life
Tope's 2002 marriage to screenwriter, Yinka Ogun, ended in 2014. The union produced four children.

Filmography

Feature films

Short films

Documentaries

Television

Awards and nominations

Honors 
OkayAfrica Okay100 Women 2017 Honoree
Excellence in The Creative Industries Award - Sisi Oge Awards 2018 
Distinguished Alumni Medal of Honor 2016 - In-short film festival
African Woman In Film Award 2015 by African Women Development Fund
 Special Award For Outstanding Contribution To Film & TV In Nigeria - Eko Star Film & TV Awards by Lagos State Govt./Nigerian Film & TV Summit/Ebonylife Media 2021

See also
 List of Nigerian film producers
 List of Youruba people

References

External links 
Official Website
 

Nigerian women film directors
Living people
Nigerian television producers
Nigerian film producers
Nigerian women film producers
University of Ilorin alumni
Lagos State University alumni
Yoruba filmmakers
Nigerian film actresses
Yoruba actresses
1979 births
Nigerian film directors
Nigerian documentary filmmakers
Women television producers
Women documentary filmmakers
Nigerian media personalities
21st-century Nigerian actresses